Ray Sawyer (February 1, 1937 – December 31, 2018) was an American percussionist and vocalist with the 1970s rock band Dr. Hook & the Medicine Show. Though primarily a backing vocalist and occasional percussionist on congas or maracas, he sang lead on their hit song "The Cover of Rolling Stone" and was a recognizable presence in the band owing to the eyepatch and cowboy hat he wore. He was also the uncle of Wild Fire vocalist Zack Sawyer.

Personal life
Sawyer lost his right eye in a 1967 automobile accident. Sawyer said the following about his life before the time of his car accident: "I must have played all the clubs from Houston to Charleston, until I decided I was going insane from too much beans and music, and I gave it up. I saw a John Wayne movie and then proceeded to Portland, Oregon, to be a logger complete with plaid shirt, caulk boots, and pike pole. On the way, my car slipped on the road and the accident left me with the eye patch I now wear. When I recovered, I ran straight back to the beans and music and vowed, 'Here, I'll stay'."

Sawyer was the lead vocalist on the band's breakthrough hit, "The Cover of Rolling Stone," as well as many of the Medicine Show's earlier songs. Eventually, by the late 1970s, as the band found commercial success, Sawyer stepped back into a backing vocalist role behind Dennis Locorriere, occasionally playing another instrument (for example, on "Better Love Next Time," one of the band's later hits, he can be seen with a prominent bongo part). Sawyer left the band in 1983, allegedly because he was no longer happy with the band's direction.

From 1988 to October 2015, Sawyer toured the nostalgia circuit as "Dr. Hook featuring Ray Sawyer", under license from Locorriere, who tours separately and owns the Dr. Hook trademark.
Sawyer retired in 2015 and died after a short illness, on December 31, 2018, at age 81.

References

External links
Dr. Hook & the Medicine Show

1937 births
2018 deaths
American male singers
American people with disabilities
American percussionists
American rock singers
Dr. Hook & the Medicine Show members
People from Mobile County, Alabama
Singers from Alabama